The 1978 Air Canada Silver Broom, the men's world curling championship, was held from March 27 to April 2 at the Winnipeg Arena in Winnipeg, Manitoba, Canada.

Teams

Round-robin standings

Round-robin results

Draw 1

Draw 2

Draw 3

Draw 4

Draw 5

Draw 6

Draw 7

Draw 8

Draw 9

Tiebreaker

Playoffs

Semifinals

Final

External links

World Men's Curling Championship
Air Canada Silver Broom
Air Canada Silver Broom
Air Canada Silver Broom
Air Canada Silver Broom
Curling competitions in Winnipeg
1970s in Winnipeg
Air Canada Silver Broom
International curling competitions hosted by Canada